Ronald Edward Frederick Kimera Muwenda Mutebi II (born 13 April 1955) is the reigning Kabaka (also known as king) of the Kingdom of Buganda, a constitutional kingdom in modern-day Uganda. He is the 36th Kabaka of Buganda.

He was appointed as UNAIDS Goodwill Ambassador for Ending AIDS among men in the Eastern and Southern Africa with a special focus on Buganda Kingdom in Uganda.

Claim to the throne
He was born at Mengo Hospital. He is the son of Edward Frederick William David Walugembe Mutebi Luwangula Muteesa II, Kabaka of Buganda, who reigned between 1939 and 1969. His mother was Nabakyala Sarah Nalule, Omuzaana Kabejja, of the Nkima clan.

He was educated at Budo Junior School, King's Mead School in Sussex and Bradfield College, a public school in West Berkshire. He then entered Magdalene College, Cambridge. At the age of 11, he was appointed as Heir Apparent by his father on 6 August 1966. While in exile he worked as Associate Editor of the magazine African Concord and a member of the Executive Committee of the African National Congress (ANC) in London. On 21 November 1969, upon the death of his father, he succeeded as the Head of the Royal House of Buganda.

He returned to Uganda in 1988, following the removal of the Obote II regime and the military junta that briefly replaced Obote II. He was proclaimed at Buddo on 24 July 1993 upon the restoration of the Ugandan Kingdoms, following the intervention of Godfrey Serunkuma Lule. On 31 July 1993, he was crowned at Buddo. He assumed the style of "His Majesty". He maintains his capital at Mengo.

Personal life
Kabaka Ronald Muwenda Mutebi II is married to one wife, Sylvia Nagginda, whom he wed on 27 August 1999 at Saint Paul's Cathedral Namirembe, in Kampala. Her official title is the Nnabagereka.

The children of Kabaka Ronald Muwenda Mutebi II include the following: 
Prince (Kiweewa) Savio Muwenda or Juunju Suuna. He was born in 1986 in London, United Kingdom to his mother, Vénantie Sebudandi. He attended King's College, Budo, before moving to England for further studies. 
Princess (Omumbejja) Joan Nassolo. 
Princess (Omumbejja) Victoria Nkinzi. 
Princess (Omumbejja) Sarah Katrina Mirembe Ssangalyambogo Nachwa. She was born in 2001 in London, UK.
Prince (Omulangira) Richard Ssemakookiro. He was born in 2011. On 17 January 2012 the former Katikkiro of Buganda, John Baptist Walusimbi, confirmed that his mother was from the Enseenene (Grasshopper) clan and was later revealed to be Rose Nansikombi from Luweero District.

Other responsibilities
On 15 April 2011, he was installed as the first chancellor of Muteesa I Royal University. The university was founded in 2007 and named in memory of Muteesa I of Buganda, in recognition of his foresight in promoting education in Buganda and Uganda and of his superior diplomatic skills in juggling the influences of the British, the French, and the Arabs in the late 1800s. 

As the head of the Buganda kingdom, he owns Nkuluze Trust, which runs the following kingdom properties:  
Buganda Land Board, which is responsible for kingdom land and other land matters
K2 Telecom - a telecommunication company
BBS Television - Kingdom TV
CBS FM
Majestic Brands - selling royal products
Ngule Beer (in collaboration with Uganda Breweries)
Muganzirwazza Plaza - a commercial building in Katwe 
Masengere Building - (which also houses Kingdom Television).

Patronages

 Patron and Chief of the Trustee Buganda Cultural and Development Foundation [BUCADEF] (since 1996). 
 Patron of the Kabaka Foundation.
 Patron of the Buganda Development Agency (BDA).
 Patron of the Monkton Foundation.

Honours

National honours
 Sovereign of the Order of the Shield and Spears.

Cultural honours
The peaceful lion, 
The Ssabalongo (head of twin parents)
Hammered legs (magulu nyondo)

Ancestry

References

External links
 "Kabaka Ronal Muwenda Mutebi II", Buganda Royal Family
 List of The Kings of Buganda
 Patterns of Marriage Among Baganda Kings
 Photo of Royal Wedding of Kabaka Mutebi and Lady Sylvia Nagginda 29 August 1999
 

Kabakas of Buganda
Alumni of Magdalene College, Cambridge
1955 births
Living people
Ganda people
African monarchs
Ugandan emigrants to the United Kingdom